Katter's Australian Party (KAP) is an agrarian political party in Australia. It was founded by Bob Katter, an independent and former Nationals MP for the seat of Kennedy, with a registration application lodged to the Australian Electoral Commission in 2011.

Katter has been re-elected under the party's label at the 2013, 2016, 2019, and 2022 federal elections. The party also won two seats at the 2012 Queensland state election which it retained at the 2015 state election. The party won an additional seat at the 2017 state election which it retained at the 2020 state election.

In June 2018, independent and former One Nation Senator for Queensland Fraser Anning joined the party, but was expelled in October 2018 for his inflammatory rhetoric concerning immigration. In February 2020, Bob Katter handed the leadership of the party to his son Robbie Katter, a Queensland state MP.

Name 

The party's application for registration was denied by the Australian Electoral Commission on 17 August 2011, on the grounds that the intended party name ("The Australian Party") was too generic and likely to cause confusion. On 27 September 2011, Katter's Australian Party was registered by the Australian Electoral Commission. Although the party was unsuccessful in registering the shorter party name "The Australian Party" nationally, its simultaneous application to register in Queensland with the abbreviated name succeeded, despite a few public objections.

Under Queensland electoral law the party appears on the state election ballots only under its abbreviated name. To avoid ballot-box party names varying across Australian states, the KAP unsuccessfully appealed to the courts to have ballots reprinted so that the full party name and not the abbreviated one would appear on ballots for the 2012 Queensland state election.

Political positions 

The KAP is orientated towards right-wing and agrarian issues. It has also been described as conservative, socially conservative, right-wing populist, and nationalist. Regarding fiscal issues, it supports protectionism, economic nationalism, and a developmentalist vision towards the implementation of tariffs. It advocates for North Queensland statehood.

Policies announced by Katter include:

Crime
 Relocation sentencing: in response to high youth crime and re-offense rates in Townsville and other North Queensland cities, KAP advocates for "relocation sentencing" at the state level, which would temporarily relocate youth offenders to remote areas in North-West Queensland, instead of releasing them back into the community where they offended.
 Mandatory minimum sentencing for repeat offenders
 Minimum three years prison for carjacking and unlawful use of a motor vehicle

Economy 
 Establish a government-owned development bank.
 Essential services such as airports, water, electricity, gas, health services, road, rail and port networks, public transport and communications should be provided by government.

Energy 
 Promote the construction of new dams for irrigation and hydro electricity generation.
 Deliver more effective and efficient power transmission networks.

Environment 
 Opposition to the carbon tax and emission trading schemes.
 Support for alternative energy such as ethanol and solar energy. This is to "Reduce carbon emissions well beyond any current carbon reducing initiatives planned by the State and Federal Government."
 Prevent the extraction of coal seam gas within three kilometres (2 mi) of an aquifer.
 Maintain government support for Australia's domestic ethanol industry and mandate the use of ethanol in petrol; in order to curb Australia's carbon footprint and to support native grain and sugar industries. 
 Restore vital irrigation water to agriculture in the Murray Darling Basin.
 Increase bio-security and quarantine laws, in order to maintain Australia's disease free status.

Firearms and gun control
 Generally make it easier for law-abiding citizens to own and operate weapons
 Revise National Firearms Agreement
 Any owner of a farming operation who has demonstrated responsible firearm ownership by holding a current weapons licence of category A, B or higher should have the right to own a category H firearm (handgun)
 Implement real-time licensing, allowing permits to be processed at the point of sale rather than manual processing

Industrial relations 
 Government must ensure that all workers, especially farmers, are able to collectively bargain for their own economic interests. 
 Government must stop the use of 457 visas by big business as a means to replace or undermine Australian workers and Australian award pay and conditions.

Infrastructure 
 Deliver better road and rail infrastructure to facilitate regional investment.

Property rights 
 No exploration or mining activity will be permitted on landholders' property without the landholder's consent.
 Personal home ownership must be made easier by government implemented policies.

Public service 
 It is the responsibility of the government to encourage and protect whistle blowers as an important method of discovery of the real health and performance of the public sector; and implement regular, random, independent and external professional audits of the public service sector.

Regulation 
 Legislate to limit Woolworths and Coles duopoly to 22.5 per cent market share each.
 Halt any privatisation and renationalise privatised assets. "Overseas companies owning basic services will need big profits for their shareholders. You would pay for the profits with price hikes to basic services."  
 Implement "orderly" marketing where industry structures undermine reasonable market power to producers (as perceived currently in dairy, egg and sugar industries).
 Restore individual rights, such as "fishing freely and boiling a billy without a permit".
 It is the duty of government to ensure bank lending creates real wealth in terms of improvements of the quality of life for the average Australian.

Trade 
 All government spending on goods to be on Australian products where possible.
 Ensure that any construction contracts undertaken using Australian government funds will use Australian steel.
 Every motor vehicle purchased under a government contract (arguably over 20% of Australia's motor vehicles) to be Australian-made.
 All clothing for armed forces, police and prisons to be manufactured in Australia. 
 Significantly increase customs duty on products coming into Australia.
 Mandate premium shelf space on Australian supermarkets for Australian manufactured goods.
 Prevent the sale of essential assets, public or private, including agricultural land and resource assets, to foreign companies and/or sovereign entities without caveats to protect the national interest.
 Government must ensure and limit against corporate monopolisation.

Federal politics

2013 federal election 
In the 2013 federal election, Katter's Australian Party received 1.04% of the nationwide vote in first preferences in the lower house, and 0.89% nationwide in the Senate. Its best performing state was Queensland with 3.75% of the lower-house vote and 2.94% of the Senate vote.

Katter retained his seat of Kennedy, despite a 16-point swing in favour of the Liberal Nationals.

2016 federal election 
In the 2016 federal election, Katter's Australian Party received 0.54% of the nationwide vote in first preferences in the lower house, and 0.38% nationwide in the Senate. Bob Katter retained his seat of Kennedy, with a swing of 8.93% towards him. The party's next-best finish was in the Division of Capricornia, where Laurel Carter polled 7.08 percent of the vote.

On 7 July 2016, while counting for the election was still underway and the final result uncertain, Katter announced that he would provide confidence and supply to the Turnbull Government in the event that it was reduced to minority government. It proved unnecessary, as the Coalition finished with a one-seat majority. In August 2017, during the parliamentary eligibility crisis, Katter announced that he could not guarantee confidence and supply if the government lost its majority.

2019 federal election 
In the 2019 Australian federal election, Bob Katter retained the seat of Kennedy. The party also ran candidates in five other electorates, plus three Queensland candidates for the Senate.

2022 federal election 
In the 2022 Australian federal election, Bob Katter retained the seat of Kennedy. The party also ran candidates in three other electorates Dawson, Herbert and Leichhardt, all of which are in Queensland.

State politics

Queensland 
The party fielded candidates at the 2012 Queensland state election. Queensland Independent MP Rob Messenger had expressed interest in joining the party, however following the merger with the Queensland Party, Messenger declared he would not join the new party as it intended to run against sitting independents at the election.

On 9 August 2011, Katter's Australian Party announced plans to merge with state Beaudesert MP Aidan McLindon's Queensland Party, with Katter's Australian Party as the surviving entity. As part of the deal, McLindon became the merged party's leader in Queensland.

On 30 October 2011, McLindon was joined by Shane Knuth, the Liberal National Party of Queensland (LNP) member for Dalrymple. Knuth, who was from the National half of the merger, objected to what he saw as a reduced voice for regional MPs in the merged party, calling it a Liberal takeover even though the merged party was dominated by former Nationals. He was also displeased with a number of tactics adopted by the LNP's organisational wing, such as grilling potential candidates and maintaining files about Labor MPs containing compromising information.

In the 2012 Queensland state election, the party contested 76 of the 89 seats in the state legislature.  Robbie Katter won Mount Isa—which is virtually coextensive with the western portion of his father's federal seat—while Knuth retained Dalrymple. McLindon was defeated in Beaudesert. Katter claimed that the Electoral Commission's decision not to print his name on the ballot cost the party 8.5% of the vote.

On 25 November 2012, the party was joined by Condamine LNP MP Ray Hopper. Like Knuth, Hopper is from the National side of the merger. As Knuth had a year earlier, Hopper claimed that the LNP had been a takeover by the old Liberal Party at the expense of the National Party, and accused the LNP of deliberately purging National influence from the party. Hopper claimed to have spoken to eight other LNP backbenchers who were considering defection. On 29 November Hopper was elected as the party's Queensland state leader.

In the 2015 Queensland state election, the party contested 11 of the 89 seats, with Knuth and Katter retaining their seats, but Hopper failed in a bid for the seat of Nanango. Due to the election's close-run result (44 Labor to 42 LNP with either needing 45), KAP was potentially in a situation to choose the government, and met with both parties and published a list of 28 demands. However, as independent MP Peter Wellington elected to support Labor on confidence and supply, this did not proceed further.

In the 2017 Queensland state election, Shane Knuth won Hill,  Robbie Katter won Traeger and increased their seat numbers to 3 with Nick Dametto winning Hinchinbrook. They also became the 3rd largest party in the Queensland Parliament.

Other states 
The Tasmanian Branch, led by Glenorchy Alderman Jenny Branch-Allen, claimed to have received many expressions of interest by potential candidates for the 2013 federal election.

Ann Bressington, an independent (and formerly No Pokies) member of the South Australian Legislative Council, announced in October 2013 that she would sponsor registration for the party at the 2014 state election, although she did not join the party herself. At the 2014 election, the party did however have two candidates for the Legislative Council, both of which were unsuccessful.

In February 2014, the Country Alliance announced that it would merge with the Victorian Branch of Katter's Australian Party for the upcoming 2014 state election, following confirmation at an extraordinary general meeting of the party. The merged parties plan to contest the election as the "Australian Country Alliance".

Donors 

Katter's Australian Party has received donations from gas, firearms, mining and taxi industries.

For the 2016–2017 financial year, the ten largest disclosed donors to the party were: NIOA (firearms manufacturer) ($191,667), United Petroleum ($150,000), Eliza Nioa ($58,333), Sporting Shooters Association of Australia ($50,000), Glencore Australia ($20,000), Stephen Curley ($17,600), Taxi Owner & Driver Welfare Association ($16,145), Taxi Council of Queensland ($15,000), Firearms Dealers Association ($8,000) and Windlab ($6,000).

A 2019 report revealed that Katter's Australian Party has taken more than $808,760 from pro-gun groups during the 2011-2018 period. The party received the most disclosed pro-gun donations of all Australian political parties.

Leaders

Federal

Queensland

President 

In 2021, KAP appointed Chris Carney as its president. Carney is a business leader in the automotive industry, based in North Queensland.

Electoral results

Federal

Queensland

South Australia

See also 

 List of political parties in Australia

References

External links 
 

2011 establishments in Australia
Agrarian parties in Australia
Australian nationalist parties
Conservative parties in Australia
Organisations based in Brisbane
Political parties established in 2011
Political parties in Queensland
Right-wing populist parties
Social conservative parties